Aurangabad is a city in Maharashtra, India.

Aurangabad, Bihar is a city in Bihar, India

Aurangabad may also refer to:

Places

Bihar
 Aurangabad, Bihar, a city
 Aurangabad district, Bihar
 Aurangabad (Bihar Lok Sabha constituency)

Maharashtra
 Aurangabad (Maharashtra Lok Sabha constituency)
 Aurangabad cantonment
 Aurangabad CIDCO
 Aurangabad district, Maharashtra
 Aurangabad division
 Aurangabad Airport
 Aurangabad Municipal Corporation
 Aurangabad railway station
 Roman Catholic Diocese of Aurangabad

Telangana
 Aurangabad, Medak, a village in Medak mandal

Uttar Pradesh
 Aurangabad Bangar, a census town in Mathura district
 Aurangabad, Bulandshahr, a nagar panchayat in Bulandshahr district

West Bengal
 Aurangabad, West Bengal, a census town in Murshidabad district
 Aurangabad, Murshidabad (Vidhan Sabha constituency), a former constituency